Pseudopieris viridula is a butterfly in the family Pieridae. It is found in Venezuela, Ecuador, Colombia and Peru.

Subspecies
The following subspecies are recognised:
Pseudopieris viridula viridula (Colombia)
Pseudopieris viridula mauritia Lamas, 2004 (Venezuela)
Pseudopieris viridula mimaripa De Marmels, Clavijo & Chacín, 2003 (Venezuela)
Pseudopieris viridula zulma Lamas, 2004 (Peru)

References

Dismorphiinae
Butterflies described in 1861
Taxa named by Baron Cajetan von Felder
Taxa named by Rudolf Felder
Pieridae of South America